Abdulaziz Majrashi (born 10 March 1996) is a Saudi Arabian professional footballer who plays as a midfielder for Saudi Pro League side Damac.

Club career
Majrashi began his career at Al-Ettifaq and signed a five-year contract with the club on 31 January 2017. He made his senior debut and scored his first goal with the club during the league match against Al-Khaleej, on 8 April 2017. On 2 February 2018, Majrashi joined Al-Fayha on loan until the end of the 2017–18 season. He made no appearances with the club and returned to Al-Ettifaq following the conclusion of the season. On 1 January 2019, he joined Al-Batin on loan until the end of the 2018–19 season. He made 15 appearances and scored no goals in all competitions as Al-Batin were relegated at the end of the season. On 7 August 2019, Majrashi was loaned out to Al-Hazem until the end of the 2019–20 season. On 26 October 2020, Majrashi joined Damac on a free transfer. On 23 July 2022, Majrashi renewed his contract with Damac until the end of the 2023–24 season.

Career statistics

Club

References

External links
 
 

1996 births
Living people
Saudi Arabian footballers
Association football midfielders
Saudi Professional League players
Ettifaq FC players
Al-Fayha FC players
Al Batin FC players
Al-Hazem F.C. players
Damac FC players